The Patwin (also Patween and Southern Wintu) are a band of Wintun people in Northern California. The Patwin comprise the southern branch of the Wintun group, native inhabitants of California since approximately 500.

Today, Patwin people are enrolled in three federally recognized tribes:
 Cachil DeHe Band of Wintun Indians of the Colusa Indian Community of the Colusa Rancheria
 Kletsel Dehe Band of Wintun Indians
 Yocha Dehe Wintun Nation.

Territory 

The Patwin were bordered by the Yuki in the northwest; the Nomlaki (Wintun) in the north; the Konkow (Maidu) in the northeast; the Nisenan (Maidu) and Plains Miwok in the east; the Bay Miwok to the south; the Coast Miwok in the southwest; and the Wappo, Lake Miwok, and Pomo in the west.

The "Southern Patwins" have historically lived between what is now Suisun, Vacaville, and Putah Creek. By 1800, the Spanish and other European settlers forced them into small tribal units: Ululatos (Vacaville), Labaytos (Putah Creek), Malacas (Lagoon Valley), Tolenas (Upper Suisun Valley), and Suisunes (Suisun Marsh and Plain).

Language

The Patwin language is a Southern Wintuan language. As of 2021, one Patwin person was a documented first-language speaker of Patwin.

Population

Estimates for the pre-contact populations of most native groups in California have varied substantially. Alfred L. Kroeber put the 1770 population of the Wintun, including the Patwin, Nomlaki, and Wintu proper, at 12,000. Sherburne F. Cook (1976a:180-181) estimated the combined population of the Patwin and Nomlaki at 11,300, of which 3,300 represented the southern Patwin. He subsequently raised his figure for the southern Patwin to 5,000.

Kroeber estimated the population of the combined Wintun groups in 1910 as 1,000. By the 1920s, no Patwin remained along Putah Creek and few were left in the area. Today, Wintun descendants of the three groups (i.e. the Patwin, Nomlaki, and Wintu proper) total about 2,500 people.

Villages

 Aguasto
 Bo´-do
 Chemocu
 Churup
 Dok´–dok
 Gapa
 Ho´lokomi
 Imil
 Katsil
 Kisi
 Koh´pah de´-he
 Koru
 Kusêmpu
 Liwai
 Lopa
 Moso
 Napato
 Nawidihu
 No´pah
 P’ālo
 Putato
 Si'-ko-pe
 Soneto
 Sukui
 Suskol
 Tebti
 Til-til
 Tokti
 Tolenas
 Tulukai
 Ululato
 Yo´doi
 Yulyul

Archaeology 
Patwin Indian remains were discovered at the Mondavi Center construction site beginning in 1999, and consequently, the University of California, Davis, built a Native American Contemplative Garden within the Arboretum, a project honoring the Patwin.

Notable Patwin people
 Mabel McKay (1907–1994), basket weaver and healer
 Sem-Yeto, 19th-century leader and diplomat, also known as "Chief Solano"

See also
Fully feathered basket

Notes

References
 Cook, Sherburne F. 1976a. The Conflict between the California Indian and White Civilization. University of California Press, Berkeley.
 Golla, Victor. 2011. California Indian Languages. University of California Press, Berkeley.
 Kroeber, A. L. 1925. Handbook of the Indians of California. Bureau of American Ethnology Bulletin No. 78. Washington, D.C.

Further reading
 Cook, Sherburne F. 1976b. The Population of the California Indians, 1769-1970. University of California Press, Berkeley.
 Johnson, Patti J. 1978. "Patwin". In California, edited by Robert F. Heizer, pp. 350–360. Handbook of North American Indians, William C. Sturtevant, general editor, vol. 8. Smithsonian Institution, Washington, D.C.
 Mithun, Marianne. 1999. The Languages of Native North America. Cambridge University Press.  (hbk); .

External links

"Native Tribes, Groups, Language Families and Dialects of California in 1770" (map after Kroeber), California Prehistory
"Patwin Language", Survey of California and Other Indian Languages, University of Berkeley
For a map of regional Native American territories, see map of Sacramento Valley Bioregion by Thayer and Mann.
History of Quail Ridge Reserve - The Patwin
"The Patweèns" (1874), Stephen Powers' Overland Monthly article on the Patwin
Interview with historian Clyde Low on Sem-Yeto and the Patwin Indian presence in Suisun Valley, part of a 2003 documentary produced by the City of Fairfield
NPR story featuring an interview with Patwin elder Bill Wright (2008)

 
Wintun
Native American tribes in California
California Mission Indians
History of Napa County, California
History of Solano County, California
History of Yolo County, California
Sacramento Valley
Vaca Mountains